Oakland is an unincorporated community in Chambers County, Alabama, United States.

References

Unincorporated communities in Chambers County, Alabama
Unincorporated communities in Alabama